The following is a list of Registered Historic Places in Kalamazoo County, Michigan.



|}

Former listings

|}

See also
 List of Michigan State Historic Sites in Kalamazoo County, Michigan
 List of National Historic Landmarks in Michigan
 National Register of Historic Places listings in Michigan
 Listings in neighboring counties: Allegan, Barry, Branch, Calhoun, Cass, St. Joseph, Van Buren

References

External links

Kalamazoo County